Mark Neveldine (born May 11, 1973) is an American filmmaker. He is best known for frequently collaborating with Brian Taylor as Neveldine/Taylor.

Early life and education
Neveldine was born in Watertown, New York, to Tom Neveldine and Carolyn Dowd Fitzpatrick. He attended college at Hobart and William Smith Colleges, where he studied drama and psychology.

Career
After graduating, he moved to Manhattan, where he began his career as an actor, writer, and director of nearly thirty productions. He subsequently transitioned into film work, becoming a cinematographer on music videos, documentaries and a television pilot.

Neveldine directed Ghost Rider: Spirit of Vengeance, the sequel to the Marvel Comics' superhero film Ghost Rider, alongside partner Brian Taylor.

Film critic Armond White praises the Neveldine-Taylor collaborations as "avant-garde".

Personal life
Neveldine married actress Alison Lohman in Watertown, New York on August 19, 2009, at St. Anthony's Catholic Church. They have three children together.

Filmography
With Brian Taylor

Solo works

References

External links
 

Film producers from New York (state)
American male screenwriters
Hobart and William Smith Colleges alumni
Living people
People from Watertown, New York
1973 births
Film directors from New York (state)
Screenwriters from New York (state)